Creeke is a surname. Notable people with the surname include:

 A. B. Creeke (1860–1932), British solicitor and early philatelist
 Christopher Crabb Creeke (1820–1886), British architect and surveyor